systat is a BSD UNIX console application for displaying system statistics in fullscreen mode using ncurses/curses. It is available on, and by default ships in the base systems of, FreeBSD, NetBSD, OpenBSD and DragonFly BSD.

Both internally and in the interface of the user the utility consists of several distinct modules and tabs, referred to as "displays" in FreeBSD, NetBSD and DragonFly, and "views" in OpenBSD, which are automatically refreshed every specified number of seconds.  These modules cover all system components, including statistics resembling vmstat, iostat and netstat in all of the BSDs, as well as pf and sensors views in some of the BSDs.  The systat utility is notably absent from OS X, where a GUI-based Activity Monitor performs similar functions.

See also 

 vmstat
 iostat
 top
 netstat

References

External links 
 

1986 software
BSD software
Computer performance
DragonFly BSD
Environmental monitoring
Free software programmed in C
Free system software
FreeBSD
Motherboard
NetBSD
OpenBSD
System administration
System monitors
Unix file system-related software
Unix network-related software
Utility software